SLE may refer to:

Medicine
 Systemic lupus erythematosus, an autoimmune disease
 St. Louis encephalitis, a mosquito-borne disease

Science and mathematics
 Semiconductor luminescence equations
 Sea level equation, following post-glacial rebound
 Schramm–Loewner evolution in statistical mechanics

Transportation
 McNary Field, airport in Salem, Oregon, US, IATA code
 Seletar Expressway, Singapore
 Sleeper Either Class, a type of railway car
 Shore Line East commuter rail service in Connecticut, USA

Other
 Sara Lee Corporation, NYSE symbol
 Separate legal entity in US
 Single loss expectancy for risk on an asset
 Societas Linguistica Europaea, a linguistics society
 Sri Lankan English
 Sierra Leonean leone currency code
 Spearhead Land Element of UK armed forces
 Supported leading edge kite, a type of power kite
 SuSE SLE operating system
 Sensory Logical Extrovert in  socionics
 The Space Link Extension of CCSDS